Corpus cavernosum may refer to:
 Corpus cavernosum clitoridis
 Corpus cavernosum penis
 "Corpus cavernosum urethrae" was used for corpus spongiosum in older texts.